Max Ippen (16 May 1906 in Vienna – 28 May 1957 in Paris) was a Czechoslovak bobsledder who competed in the late 1940s. At the 1948 Winter Olympics in St. Moritz, he finished 14th in both the two-man and four-man events. During World War II, he was imprisoned in the Dachau concentration camp.

References

External links
 1948 bobsleigh two-man results
 1948 bobsleigh four-man results
 Max Ippen's profile at Sports Reference.com
 Biography of Max Ippen 

Olympic bobsledders of Czechoslovakia
Bobsledders at the 1948 Winter Olympics
Czechoslovak male bobsledders
Sportspeople from Vienna
1906 births
1957 deaths
Czechoslovak emigrants to France